Pale was an ancient Greek city in ancient Cephalonia. In 435 BCE Pale supported Corinth against Corcyra by sending four ships. Its territory was called Paleis (Παλείς).

Its site is located near the modern Lixouri.

References

See also
Pronnoi
Cranii
List of cities in ancient Epirus

Populated places in ancient Cephalonia

Former populated places in Greece